Fabian Liebig (born 18 June 1994) is a German modern pentathlete.

He participated at the 2018 World Modern Pentathlon Championships, winning a medal.

References

External links

Living people
1994 births
German male modern pentathletes
World Modern Pentathlon Championships medalists
Modern pentathletes at the 2020 Summer Olympics